The Chinese characters 三河, meaning "Three Rivers", may refer to:

Japan
Mikawa Province (三河国), a former partition of Japan
Mikawa-Anjō Station (三河安城駅)

Mainland China
Sanhe, Hebei (三河市), county-level city in Langfang, Hebei
Sanhe Subdistrict, Chengdu (三河街道), in Xindu District, Chengdu, Sichuan
Towns named Sanhe (三河镇)
Sanhe, Dapu County, Guangdong
Sanhe, Feixi County, Anhui
Sanhe, Haiyuan County, Ningxia
Sanhe, Hongze County, Jiangsu
Sanhe Town, Longnan, in Wudu District, Longnan, Gansu
Sanhe, Yanling County, Hunan
Sanhe, Yilong County, Sichuan
Sanhe Township (三河乡)
Sanhe Township, Longnan, in Wudu District, Longnan, Gansu
Sanhe Township, Lipu County, Guangxi
Sanhe Hui Ethnic Township (三河回族乡), Ergun City, Inner Mongolia

See also
 Sanhe (disambiguation), for topics that are romanised as "Sanhe" but not written in Chinese as "三河".